Events in the year 1813 in Japan.

Incumbents 
Monarch: Kōkaku

Deaths 
December 24 - Empress Go-Sakuramachi (b. 1740)

References

 
Japan
Years of the 19th century in Japan